Edoardo Daniele Villa (1915–2011) was a notable South African  sculptor of Italian descent who worked primarily in steel, and bronze.

Early life
Villa was born in Bergamo, Italy and  he studied at the Andrea Fontini Art School.  While studying sculpture in Milan, in 1939,  Villa was conscripted for two years into the Italian army at the outbreak of World War II.  By 1940 he was posted to North Africa, where he was injured and captured in Egypt by the English.  Some time between 1941 and 1942, he was shipped to South Africa where he then spent the next four years at the Zonderwater prisoner of war camp.  Zonderwater was opened in February 1941 and by the end of 1942 and  held 63 000 prisoners under the care of Colonel H.F. Prinsloo whose head was later sculpted in bronze by Villa for the military museum. After his release, Villa  remained in South Africa where he continued his vocation as a sculptor.

Career beginnings

Villa started work with conventional heads and figures and changed to work on stylized abstractions.  His work includes abstract explanations of the human condition but retains some figurative concepts.  Villa's work  has a strong cross-cultural synthesis which involves the Italian and the African.  It is clearly informed by the cubism  of Picasso (who had discovered African art in Paris at the Trocadero).

Villa gave an interview in which he said, “After being a prisoner of war in South Africa I decided to stay and start my career because of the opportunities available for the youth, the ‘open space’ as opposed to the ‘closed’ life of a continental. Everything in Europe I felt had been done, questioned and exhausted. Here, in Africa, I felt I had the opportunity to explore ... If anything could sum up my fundamental concern in art, it is that of the human and the individual – the human condition …. Museums are marvellous but human participation, physical proximity and tactile engagement are more important.”

Style and technique

Villa's sculpture developed further during the 1950s, when the use of cut steel and   bronze.  At this time he also taught at the  Polly Art Centre in Johannesburg. The Polly Art Centre was founded as an adult education institution; in 1952 it was converted into an art and exhibition centre. Until its closure in 1960, it was the only place – apart from a few private galleries – where black artists in Johannesburg could pursue their art and show their works.

In 1961, along with Cecil Skotnes, Cecily Sash, Giuseppe Cattaneo, and Sydney Kumalo, Villa made up the artist group “Amadlozi” (Zulu for “ancestors”) for the conscious appropriation of African sculptural traditions.

Villa's work includes larger than life steel installations, such as Reclining Figure in Pieter Roos Park, Johannesburg. This work was intended as a play statue for children, paid for by Anglo American, selected by the Parktown and Westcliffe Heritage Trust and donated to the City of Johannesburg and unveiled by the Deputy Mayor of Johannesburg Councillor C.E. Fabel on 8 September 1984.

Edoardo Villa  represented South Africa at the Venice Biennale on five occasions and he has received awards at the São Paulo Biennales of 1957 and 1959. He has exhibited in over a hundred shows in Italy, Europe, England, Israel, South America, Africa and the United States.

In 1994/1995 Villa donated 140 small and 10 large works to the University of Pretoria. On 31 May 1995, to celebrate the artist's 80th birthday, the Edoardo Villa Museum was officially opened at the University of Pretoria, South Africa.

Villa lived and worked at his home in Johannesburg,  He was a friend of the artist and art collector, Vittorino Meneghelli, the author Jillian Becker and the architect Monty Sack. Villa died in hospital on 1 May 2011 at age 95.

References

See also
Edoardo Villa Museum

1915 births
2011 deaths
South African sculptors
Academic staff of the University of Pretoria
Italian emigrants to South Africa
Italian South African